Anaxidamus was a king of Sparta, 11th of the Eurypontids.

Anaxidamus was the son of Zeuxidamus and contemporary with Anaxander, and lived to the conclusion of the Messenian Wars, 668 BC (Paus. iii. 7. § 5.) He was succeeded by his son Archidamus I.

References

7th-century BC rulers
7th-century BC Spartans
Eurypontid kings of Sparta
Messenian Wars